The men's 400 metres hurdles event at the 1999 European Athletics U23 Championships was held in Göteborg, Sweden, at Ullevi on 29 and 30 July 1999.

Medalists

Results

Final
30 July

Heats
29 July
Qualified: first 2 in each heat and 2 best to the Final

Heat 1

Heat 2

Heat 3

Participation
According to an unofficial count, 24 athletes from 18 countries participated in the event.

 (1)
 (1)
 (1)
 (1)
 (1)
 (1)
 (2)
 (1)
 (2)
 (2)
 (1)
 (1)
 (1)
 (1)
 (1)
 (2)
 (1)
 (3)

References

400 metres hurdles
400 metres hurdles at the European Athletics U23 Championships